Walter von Hauff (born 10 May 1949 in Munich) is a German actor who specializes in dubbing.

Filmography

Television animation
Buzz Lightyear of Star Command (Buzz Lightyear)
Family Guy (Tom Tucker (second voice), Adam West (third voice))
Hey Arnold! (Bob Pataki)
One Piece (Captain Kuro, Iceburg)
The Simpsons (Reverend Lovejoy (fifth voice))
South Park (Mister Mackey (second voice))

Original video animation
Stuart Little 3: Call of the Wild (Frederick Little)

Film animation
Finding Nemo (Moonfish)
Monsters, Inc. (Yeti)
Pom Poko (Narrator)
Toy Story (Buzz Lightyear)
Toy Story 2 (Buzz Lightyear)
Toy Story 3 (Buzz Lightyear)
Toy Story 4 (Buzz Lightyear)

Live action
Big Trouble (Officer Walter Kramitz)
Bowling for Columbine (Michael Moore)
Crouching Tiger, Hidden Dragon (Li Mu-bai)
Fahrenheit 9/11 (Michael Moore)
The Life Aquatic with Steve Zissou (Klaus Daimler)
Monty Python's Flying Circus (Terry Jones)
Sleepwalkers (Captain Ira Soames)
Stuart Little (Frederick Little)
Stuart Little 2 (Frederick Little)

External links

German Dubbing Card Index

1949 births
German male voice actors
Living people